Omentopus is a genus of mites in the family Acaridae.

Species
 Omentopus avicolus Fain, 1978

References

Acaridae